V389 Cygni, also known as HD 201433 and HR 8094, is a star about 390 light years from the Earth, in the constellation Cygnus. It is a 5th-magnitude star, making it faintly visible to the naked eye of an observer far from city lights. V389 Cygni is a multiple star. One component of that system is a slowly pulsating B-type star (SPB) causing the system's brightness to vary from magnitude 5.55 to 5.71 over a period of 1.4 days.

V389 Cygni is catalogued as a multiple star with four visible components. A 5th-magnitude and 8th-magnitude star separated by  form a common proper motion pair, generall referred to as components A and B). The brighter star, component A, is a spectroscopic binary and the system also harbours an unseen third star, making it a triple and the system as a whole then includes four stars. Both the visible stars are chemically peculiar, A being an Ap star and B an Am star. The blended spectral class of the pair is B9V, with the brighter star having a class of B9VspSi (or B9 Si Mg) and the fainter kA2.5hA7VmA9n.

Component A of V389 Cygni was discovered to be a spectroscopic binary from spectra obtained in 1918.  In 1921 Reynold Young of the Dominion Astrophysical Observatory derived its orbit from 49 additional spectra obtained in 1920-1921. He found it to have a circular orbit, with a period of 3.3137 days. He noted that the star showed evidence of variability.

In 1922 Kurt Bottlinger and Paul Guthnick detected variability in V389 Cygni.
Between 1936 and 1942, Guthnick made extensive photoelectric observations of V389 Cygni. He found that sometimes the brightness appeared to change irregularly, and at other times two periods, 1.12912 and 1.19328 days, could be seen. Neither period was related to the orbital period of the spectroscopic binary. Guthnick postulated that the system consisted of two Cepheid variables orbiting each other, but it is now believed that only one of the stars in the close binary pair is variable, and it is an SPB star.

In 1978, Frank Gieseking and Wilhelm Seggewiss refined Young's orbit determination for the spectroscopic binary (new period  days), and found that V389 Cygni is a triple star. The third, unseen component, orbits the close binary pair with a period of  days. They were unable to derive a nonzero eccentricity for either orbit.

In 2017, Thomas Kallinger et al. published an extensive spectroscopic and astroseismic study of V389 Cygni. They found 29 pulsation frequencies in the BRITE satellite data for the star. Their astroseismic results indicate that the outer layer of the SPB star is in the process of becoming tidally locked to its close companion, but the inner portion of the star still rotates at a significantly different speed.

References

Slowly pulsating B stars
Cygnus (constellation)
104371
201433
Durchmusterung objects
Cygni, V389
Am stars
Ap stars
8094